Lise Kristiansen is a Norwegian handball player. She played on the Norway women's national handball team at the 1997 World Women's Handball Championship, where Norway placed second.

References

Year of birth missing (living people)
Living people
Norwegian female handball players
20th-century Norwegian women